The 2002 Hel van het Mergelland was the 29th edition of the Volta Limburg Classic cycle race and was held on 6 April 2002. The race started and finished in Eijsden. The race was won by Corey Sweet.

General classification

References

2002
2002 in road cycling
2002 in Dutch sport